Carsten Ball and Bobby Reynolds were the defending champions but decided not to participate together.
Ball played alongside Ryan Harrison, but they lost to David Rice and Sean Thornley in the first round. Reynolds partnered with Alex Bogomolov Jr., but they withdrew because of a plantar fasciitis injury contracted by Reynolds.
Teymuraz Gabashvili and Denys Molchanov defeated Michael Russell and Tim Smyczek 6–2, 7–5 in the final to win the title.

Seeds

Draw

Draw

References
 Main Draw

Savannah Challenger - Doubles
2013 Doubles